The Face of a Genius is a 1966 American documentary film about Eugene O’Neill, produced by Alfred R. Kelman for WBZ-TV Boston. It was nominated for an Academy Award for Best Documentary Feature, the first time that a film originally produced for television was recognized by the Academy as a nominee for Best Documentary Feature.

See also
List of American films of 1966

References

External links

1966 films
1960s English-language films
American documentary films
1966 documentary films
Documentary films about playwrights
Films about Nobel laureates
1960s American films